The National Natural Landmarks in Michigan include 12 of the almost 600 United States National Natural Landmarks (NNLs). They cover areas of geological and biological importance, and include bogs, several forest types, and habitats for several rare species. The landmarks are located in 12 of the state's 83 counties. Two counties have two Natural Landmarks each, while two Landmarks are located in parts of two counties. The first designation, Warren Woods State Park, was made in 1967, while the most recent, the Porcupine Mountains, was made in 1984. Owners include Michigan State University, private individuals and several state and federal agencies.

The National Natural Landmarks Program is administered by the National Park Service, a branch of the Department of the Interior. The National Park Service determines which properties meet NNL criteria and makes nomination recommendations after an owner notification process. The Secretary of the Interior reviews nominations and, based on a set of predetermined criteria, makes a decision on NNL designation or a determination of eligibility for designation. Both public and privately owned properties can be designated as NNLs. Owners may object to the nomination of the property as a NNL. This designation provides indirect, partial protection of the historic integrity of the properties via tax incentives, grants, monitoring of threats, and other means.

National Natural Landmarks

References
 General
 

Specific

Michigan
National Natural Landmarks